Mesosa fruhstorferi is a species of beetle in the family Cerambycidae. It was described by Stephan von Breuning in 1968. It is known from Vietnam.

References

fruhstorferi
Beetles described in 1968